The South-West News is a suburban newspaper published in Brisbane, Queensland, Australia. It is one of 16 suburban newspapers published in Brisbane and surrounding areas by Quest Newspapers which is owned by News Corporation.

It has been published as a weekly newspaper since 1895. It is delivered free to homes in the target group of suburbs and depends on advertising from mostly local businesses for its income.

References

Newspapers published in Brisbane
News Corp Australia
1895 establishments in Australia